Caroline Framke (born 1988) an American writer and critic and is Chief TV Critic at Variety. Formerly, she was a columnist at Vox and has contributed to The Atlantic, The A.V. Club, Flavorwire, Complex, Vulture, Salon, and NPR.

Her gender and culture commentary have been featured in books. She has studied and written about the #MeToo movement, and her analysis was featured in The New York Times  Editor's Reading List of 2017. Framke was the head of a widely covered study that found that in the 2015–2016 television season, 10% of character deaths were of LGBT women, even though they made up an extremely small percentage of total characters.

References 

Living people
21st-century American non-fiction writers
Place of birth missing (living people)
American film critics
American women film critics
American television critics
Smith College alumni
21st-century American women writers
American women non-fiction writers
American people of Iranian descent
1988 births